Dragon Blaze is a shoot 'em up arcade game developed and published in 2000 by Psikyo. It was ported to the PlayStation 2 as part of Taito's Psikyo Shooting Collection Vol. 3: Sol Divide & Dragon Blaze compilation in 2005. The game was later also released on its own as a budget range title for the PlayStation 2 in Europe by 505 Games on 2006. In 2018 the game was ported to the Nintendo Switch by ZeroDiv as part of their series of re-releases of classic Psikyo games. The game was later ported to PlayStation 4.

Gameplay
Dragon Blaze plays like many typical 2D vertically scrolling shooters by Psikyo, although this game is closer to the bullet hell genre than most of the company's other output and the color of the enemies' bullets has been changed from Psikyo's trademark orange to a neon purple. The game gives each character (Quaid, Sonia, Ian, Rob) the standard normal shot, charged shot, and magic bomb, but each character also rides a dragon, which can be dismounted and be used as a weapon itself. The dismounted dragon initially acts as a piercing weapon, and then remains stationary shooting until the player calls it back using the same button. It can also be used to collect items.

Reception 
In Japan, Game Machine listed Dragon Blaze on their November 1, 2000 issue as being the fourth best-performing arcade game at the time.

References

External links
 

Dragon Blaze at Hardcore Gaming 101
Dragon Blaze at the International Arcade Museum
Dragon Blaze at World of Arcades

2000 video games
Arcade video games
Video games about dragons
Fantasy video games
PlayStation 2 games
Psikyo games
Vertically scrolling shooters
Video games developed in Japan
Video games featuring female protagonists
Nintendo Switch games
Multiplayer and single-player video games
505 Games games